Trofeo Masferrer was a road bicycle race held annually in Catalonia, Spain from 1932 until 1994.

Winners

References

Cycle races in Spain
Recurring sporting events established in 1932
1932 establishments in Spain
Cycle races in Catalonia
1994 disestablishments in Spain
Defunct cycling races in Spain
Recurring sporting events disestablished in 1994